Benjamin Lee McAdoo (born July 9, 1977) is an American football coach, who most recently served as the offensive coordinator of the Carolina Panthers in the National Football League (NFL). McAdoo was most notably the head coach of the New York Giants from 2016 to 2017, after serving as their offensive coordinator the previous two years under former head coach Tom Coughlin. He was fired from that position on December 4, 2017 following a 2–10 start, along with benching longtime starting quarterback Eli Manning. At the time of his termination, his 28 regular season games were the fewest by a Giants coach since 1930. Prior to working for the Panthers, McAdoo has also served as an assistant coach for several college football teams, as well as for the New Orleans Saints, the San Francisco 49ers, Green Bay Packers, Jacksonville Jaguars, and Carolina Panthers.

Early life
McAdoo was born in Homer City, Pennsylvania. He graduated from Homer-Center Junior/Senior High School in 1995. McAdoo attended Indiana University of Pennsylvania (IUP) and earned a degree in health and physical education. Later, he received his master's degree in kinesiology from Michigan State University.

Coaching career

Early career
While attending Indiana University of Pennsylvania (IUP), McAdoo began working as an assistant high school coach in his sophomore year of college. He returned to his alma mater Homer-Center to be an assistant coach for the 1996 and 1997 seasons, then he was an assistant at Indiana Area High School from 1998 to 1999. McAdoo graduated from IUP summa cum laude in health and physical education.

He then became a graduate assistant for the Michigan State Spartans football team under head coach Bobby Williams while pursuing a master's degree in kinesiology at Michigan State University. In the 2001 season, McAdoo earned his first collegiate coaching position as a graduate assistant for special teams and offense.

McAdoo was the offensive line and tight ends coach at Fairfield University for the 2002 season, in what would be the final season for the Fairfield Stags football team. In 2003, McAdoo became a graduate assistant at the University of Pittsburgh under head coach Walt Harris and helped the team in the 2003 Continental Tire Bowl.

After initially accepting an assistant coach position at Akron, McAdoo resigned to become offensive quality control coach for the New Orleans Saints in 2004 under head coach Jim Haslett. McAdoo interviewed with offensive coordinator Mike McCarthy.

McAdoo coached tight ends and offensive tackles at Stanford for the 2005 spring camp, then resigned to be assistant offensive line and quality control coach for the San Francisco 49ers, reuniting with Mike McCarthy. In 2006, McCarthy became head coach for the Green Bay Packers and added McAdoo to his staff as tight ends coach. McAdoo coached tight ends for the Packers until the 2011 season, and then coached quarterbacks from 2012 to 2013. McAdoo was a member of the coaching staff of the 2010 Packers team that won Super Bowl XLV.

New York Giants

Offensive coordinator (2014–2015)
In 2014, McAdoo joined Tom Coughlin’s staff as the offensive coordinator for the New York Giants. In his first season as offensive coordinator, the Giants offense improved from the 28th-highest-scoring offense in 2013 under Kevin Gilbride to 13th in 2014. In 2015, the offense took another leap forward, becoming the sixth-highest-scoring offense despite losing starting left tackle Will Beatty, starting wide receiver Victor Cruz, and starting tight end Larry Donnell for most of the season due to injury.

Head coach (2016–2017)
On January 14, 2016, McAdoo was named the Giants’ 17th head coach in franchise history. On September 11, 2016, McAdoo won his first game as head coach when the Giants defeated the Dallas Cowboys 20–19. The Giants finished the 2016 season with an 11–5 record under McAdoo, tying the franchise record held by Dan Reeves for most regular season wins by a first year head coach. The Giants returned to the playoffs for the first time since 2011, but lost to the Green Bay Packers 38–13.

The Giants' 2017 season was marred by numerous player injuries and other known controversies, which included some players being suspended for team violations, slumping the Giants to an 0–5 start, the first for the team since 2013 before getting a road victory in Week 6 against the Denver Broncos. On November 28, 2017 McAdoo replaced Eli Manning with Geno Smith prior to the Week 13 game against the Oakland Raiders, which ended Manning's 210-consecutive start streak. This marked an uproar in the New York Giants community and was widely seen as the nail in the coffin for McAdoo's tenure with the Giants. After losing 24–17 to the Oakland Raiders and sitting at 2–10, McAdoo was fired by the Giants on December 4, 2017, along with general manager Jerry Reese.

Jacksonville Jaguars
On February 11, 2020, McAdoo was hired by the Jacksonville Jaguars as their quarterbacks coach. He was let go following the season.

Dallas Cowboys
On May 26, 2021, McAdoo was hired by the Dallas Cowboys as a consultant.

Carolina Panthers
On January 24, 2022, McAdoo was hired by the Carolina Panthers as their offensive coordinator under head coach Matt Rhule, replacing Joe Brady.

Personal life
McAdoo is married to his wife Toni, a fellow native of Homer City. They have a daughter and a son.

Head coaching record

References

1977 births
Living people
Carolina Panthers coaches
Fairfield Stags football coaches
Green Bay Packers coaches
High school football coaches in Pennsylvania
Indiana University of Pennsylvania alumni
Michigan State Spartans football coaches
Michigan State University alumni
National Football League offensive coordinators
New Orleans Saints coaches
New York Giants coaches
New York Giants head coaches
People from Homer City, Pennsylvania
Pittsburgh Panthers football coaches
San Francisco 49ers coaches
University of Pittsburgh alumni